Chinese Garden is a park in Jurong East, Singapore. Built in 1975 by the JTC Corporation and designed by Prof. Yuen-chen Yu, an architect from Taiwan, the Chinese Garden's concept is based on Chinese gardening art. The main characteristic is the integration of architectural features with the natural environment. The Chinese Garden is modeled along the northern Chinese imperial style of architecture and landscaping. It is located next to Chinese Garden MRT station and connected to the adjacent Japanese Garden by a bridge. Along with Japanese Garden, the two gardens are collectively known as the Jurong Gardens.

Features

Stone Lions
A pair of cloudy-grained marble stone lions at the main gates of the Chinese Garden, guarding the main gates of the garden. The marble stone used to sculpt the lions was imported from Taiwan.

Bridge

The 13-arch White Rainbow Bridge (Bái hóngqiáo) at the garden follows the style of the Seventeen-Arch Bridge at the Summer Palace in Peking.

In 1989 a second bridge, the Bridge of Double Beauty, was built, to connect the Chinese with the Japanese Garden.

Main Arch Building
The Main Arch Building is a standard Chinese arch building. This building is popular for picture-taking.
Inside the main arch building, there are two courtyards, namely the “Early Spring Courtyard” and “Garden Courtyard”. Also, there is a fishpond in the centre which is named the “Fishes Paradise”.

Stone Boat and Tea House
A famous traditional feature of Chinese architecture is the Stone Boat structure. Its design and architectural beauty are considered to be a fine art that has been praised by people throughout the world. 

The style of Yao-Yueh Fang (the Stone Boat) in the Chinese Garden is based on the Peking style, but with some adaptations in the design and usage of materials.

The Ming Hsiang Hsieh (Tea House) is a miniature structure following the style of the elaborate, winding gallery at the Summer Palace. This meandering design is a characteristic and graceful Chinese architectural feature.

Pagoda

In ancient times, pagodas, originally simple tower structures located beside temples, were used for the storage of human ashes (in urns) by Buddhists. In later times, pagodas were developed into structures which are considered to possess "striking architectural beauty". 

The Ru Yun T'a (7-storey pagoda) is situated on a small hill in the Chinese Garden. Its typical pagoda design follows the style of Linggu Temple Pagoda at Nanjing.

Pavilion, Plateau and Tower
The Chinese Pavilion, Plateau and Tower are considered to be an important part of the Chinese gardening art. The artistic features, typical of Chinese architecture, have long been appreciated by man.
The design of the four pavilions at the Chinese Garden is based on the style of Northern Chinese Pavilions, and decorated to blend harmoniously with the garden.

Bonsai Garden

Opened in June 1992, the Suzhou-style Bonsai Garden cost an estimated $3.8 million to build. This 5,800-square-metre garden with Suzhou-style buildings (incorporating a main hall of 50 square metres) and landscape houses a collection of over 2,000 bonsais imported from China and other parts of the world.

The Bonsai Garden is considered to be  "a beauty that must be seen to be believed".  It is designed as a largest Suzhou-style Bonsai garden of its kind outside of China.

A Bonsai Training Centre has been launched. The public are encouraged to sign up for the course, which will be taught by  Bonsai experts from Shanghai and Suzhou (China). They will teach how to prune and care for Bonsais and how to appreciate the beauty of this unique artistry.

Garden of Abundance
The newest addition to the Chinese Garden family is the Garden of Abundance. The original name of this garden is the Zodiac & Pomegranate Garden, derived from the elements used for the construction of the garden.

It consists of pomegranate trees, the 12 Chinese Zodiac animals sculpture, a sundial, stone bridges and planting of materials.

100-year-old pomegranate trees from Shantung, China have been  planted into this new garden. They sit among the 12 Chinese Zodiac Animal sculptures.

Live Turtle and Tortoise Museum
The Live Turtle and Tortoise Museum, a primary attraction in Chinese Garden, exhibits various species of turtles and tortoises. 
In 2019, the museum moved out from the gardens and relocated to Yishun; this was due to upgrading works carried out in the surrounding Jurong Lake District.

East Entrance
This entrance was constructed in conjunction with the Chinese Garden MRT station, to ensure easy access for pedestrians visiting the gardens. Upon approaching the garden, there is a Red Bridge that will lead you in. Four stone lions, welcoming the visitors that are entering the garden, "guard" the entrance.

Renovation

JTC Corporation is planning a year-long "redecoration and refurbishment" project starting at the end of 2014.  The areas to be repaired include the main entrance plaza, the pavilions, the iconic pagodas, the Stone Boat and footpaths. The repair works involve removing wood that has rotted or become infested by termites. These also include patching up spalling concrete and cracked walls, replacing broken and loose roof tiles, stopping water leakage, as well as replacing old electrical wiring, timber footpaths or rusted fittings.

References

External links

 Official website: Chinese Garden
  Your Singapore - Chinese Garden
 360° X 360° Interactive VR of the Singapore Chinese Gardens

Buildings and structures completed in 1975
Chinese-Singaporean culture
Singapore
Jurong East
Parks in Singapore
Tourist attractions in Singapore
20th-century architecture in Singapore